E-girls and e-boys, sometimes collectively known as e-kids, are a youth subculture of Gen Z that emerged in the late 2010s, notably popularized by the video-sharing app TikTok. It is an evolution of emo, scene and mall goth fashion combined with Japanese street fashion (such as anime, cosplay, kawaii and lolita fashion) and K-pop fashion.

Videos by e-girls and e-boys tend to be flirtatious and, many times, overtly sexual.

According to Business Insider, the terms are not gender-specific, instead referring to two separate styles of fashion, stating that "While the e-boy is a vulnerable 'softboi' and embraces skate culture, the e-girl is cute and seemingly innocent".

Origins

The terms "e-girl" and "e-boy" are derived from "electronic boy" and "electronic girl", due to their association with the internet. "E-girl" was first used, in the late-2000s, as an objectifying pejorative against women perceived to be seeking out male attention online. According to an article by Business Insider, the earliest example of e-girls were found on Tumblr, with Vice Media stating the subculture evolved out of the earlier emo and scene cultures. Vox writer Rebecca Jennings instead referred to the Tumblr aesthetic as a precursor of the subculture, as it lacked the cutesy aspect that would come to define e-girl hair and makeup.

Ruby Barry of Heatworld traces the origins of e-girl fashion to 2000s Japanese street fashion, including anime, kawaii and lolita fashion styles. Kayla Marci of Edited described it as an evolution of emo, scene and mall goth fashion that was heavily influenced by Asian fashion styles such as anime, cosplay and K-pop. i-D referred to Avril Lavigne as "the original e-girl" due to her polished take on alternative fashion, contrast to mainstream norms of the time and affinity for Japanese kawaii culture. Additionally, fictional characters such as Ramona Flowers, Harley Quinn and Sailor Moon were influential on the development of the subculture.

By the late-2010s, e-boys had split from this original all female culture, embracing elements of emo, mallgoth, and scene culture. The popularity and eventual death of emo rapper Lil Peep also influenced the beginnings of the subculture, with the New York Post describing him as "the patron musical saint of e-land". E-boys also make use of "soft-boy aesthetics" through presenting themselves as sensitive and vulnerable. According to the Brown Daily Herald this is due to a transformation of ideal male attractiveness from being traditionally masculine to embracing introvertedness, shyness, emotional vulnerability and androgyny.

Mainstream popularity

The subculture began in 2018, following the worldwide release of TikTok. According to an article in i-D, the subculture's emergence on the app challenged the polished and edited photos of influencers and VSCO girls common on Instagram, due to TikTok lacking the features to do so. An article by CNN stated that "If VSCO girls are the sunshine-basking hippies of 2020, e-girls are the opposite". The subculture first began to gain mainstream attention in 2019. MEL Magazine attributed the subculture's popularity to the increased interest of K-Pop groups like BTS, Exo and Got7 in the Western mainstream, due to the two's similar style of dress and hair. A trend soon began on TikTok and other social media platforms, where people would upload videos "transforming" into an e-boy or e-girl, according to Vox Media, this is how the culture "entered the mainstream lexicon". In the summer of 2019, Belle Delphine's emerging online prominence helped bring attention to the e-girl subculture; Business Insider described Delphine as "a symbol of the first wave of e-girl". The July 2019 murder of Bianca Devins also brought attention to e-girls due to Devins' participation in the subculture.

The subculture continued to grow in prominence through 2020, with Vogue publishing an article featuring Doja Cat discussing e-girl makeup, and "e-girl style" being in the top 10 trending fashion terms on Google in the year. Additionally, a number of mainstream celebrities began to adopt the bleached stripes hairstyle associated with e-girls, including American socialite Kylie Jenner and Kosovar-English singer Dua Lipa. In July, high fashion designer Hedi Slimane released a preview of a collection called "the Dancing Kid" for Celine, influenced by the fashion of e-boys. In a July 29 article from GQ, fashion critic Rachel Tashjian referenced this as a sign that "TikTok is now driving fashion". Corpse Husband's song "E-Girls Are Ruining My Life!", which was released in September, gained large amounts of attention on TikTok, eventually charting in the UK Singles Chart for three weeks. In late 2020 and early 2021, a number of high fashion designers, namely Ludovic de Saint Sernin and Celine, began designing collections inspired by e-boy fashion. Both InStyle and Paper magazine credited e-boys and e-girls as important to the rise in popularity and resurgence of pop punk in the 2020s.

Fashion

The subculture's fashion is inspired by a number of prior subcultures, fashion trends and forms of entertainment, including mall goth, 1990s–2000s fashion, skater culture, anime, Japanese street fashion, cosplay, K-pop, BDSM, emo, scene, hip hop, and rave. Dazed described the aesthetic as "A little bit bondage, a little bit baby". Outfits commonly consist of baggy, thrifted clothes. In particular, some e-girls wear mesh shirts, plaid skirts, oversized t-shirts, crop tops, platform shoes, chokers and beanies, while e-boys wear oversized sweaters or monochrome clothes and band merchandise layered over long sleeve striped shirts, and polo necks. Chain necklaces, wallet chains and dangle earrings are also frequently worn. E-boys often wear curtained hair, whereas e-girls hair is dyed neon-colors often times pink or blue, or is bleached blonde in the front. Some tie their hair into pigtails. Hair dyed two different colours down the centre (known as "split-dye hair") is common amongst both sexes.

Both boys and girls may wear heavy makeup, in particular pink blush on the cheeks and nose, imitating anime. Fake freckles unkempt nail polish, and winged eye liner are common. YouTuber Jenna Marbles made a video imitating an e-girl's makeup style, calling it a mix between "Harajuku, emo, and igari makeup", the latter of which is a Japanese makeup style imitative of a hangover. Some e-girls draw over their philtrum using lipstick to make their lips look rounder. One notable element of e-girl makeup is under-eye stamps, often in a heart shape, a trend that has been influenced by Marina Diamandis. Discussion of mental health is also common.

Music
E-boys and e-girls are associated with "Sad Boy" music, a broadly defined grouping of musicians, who similarly write music influenced by sadness and mental illness, that often overlaps with emo rap. The term has been criticized by artists such as James Blake, due to its portrayal of mental illness, which he considers "unhealthy and problematic". 

In the 2020s, it became common for participants of the subculture to listen to artists associated with the 2020s pop punk revival.

See also
Boxxy
Scene (subculture)
Internet culture
Youth subculture
Yé-yé girls

References

External links

2010s fashion
2020s fashion
2010s in Internet culture
2020s in Internet culture
Internet memes introduced in the 2010s
TikTok
2010s neologisms
Youth culture
Generation Z